Eva McPherson Clayton (born September 16, 1934) is an American politician from North Carolina. On taking her seat in the United States House of Representatives following a special election in 1992, Clayton became the first African American to represent North Carolina in the House since George Henry White was elected to his second and last term in 1898. She was re-elected and served for five terms. In 2003, Clayton was appointed Assistant Director-General of the United Nations's Food and Agriculture Organization (FAO), based in Rome.

Early life and education
Born Eva McPherson in Savannah, Georgia, Clayton graduated with a Bachelor of Science degree from Johnson C. Smith University in Charlotte, North Carolina, and a Master of Science degree from North Carolina Central University in Durham, North Carolina.  She also attended law school at North Carolina Central University.

Career
Clayton worked on the Soul City community development project in Warren County, North Carolina.  In 1977, she was appointed Assistant Secretary for Community Development for the North Carolina State Department of Natural Resources and Community Development and served from 1977 to 1981.

From 1982 to 1992, Clayton served as an elected member and chair of the Warren County Board of Commissioners. In 1992, she was elected from the 1st congressional district in North Carolina to the United States House of Representatives as a Democrat; at the same time she won a special election to finish the remaining months in 1992 of the term of Congressman Walter B. Jones Sr.

North Carolina had amended its constitution in 1899 to disfranchise Blacks, as did most southern states from 1890-1908, and no Black candidates were elected to Congress in the succeeding 92 years. When Representative Walter Jones Sr., announced his retirement in 1992, Clayton entered the Democratic primary to fill his seat. Recently reapportioned by the state legislature, the congressional district was one of two in North Carolina that had a black majority In 1992.  Clayton and Mel Watt became the first African Americans to win election to the House from North Carolina since 1898. (As Clayton won a special election, she took office before Watt). Watt's 12th congressional district was one of two minority majority districts developed in the 1990s, in order to give the substantial minority of African Americans in the state the ability to elect candidates of their choice, in compliance with the Voting Rights Act of 1965.

Clayton gained national attention as president of her Democratic freshman class in Congress. During her ten years of distinguished service as a United States Congresswoman, Clayton served on the House Agriculture Committee and as the ranking member of the United States Department of Agriculture's Operations Oversight, Nutrition, and Forestry Subcommmittees.  She also served on the House Budget and Small Business Committees.  She was actively engaged in the legislative development of the Department of Agriculture's Operation policy.  She was a conferee on the 2002 Farm Bill and is recognized by national organizations, including the National Journal publications, for providing essential leadership by garnering support for nutritional programs and the civil rights and support for African American farmers in the final version of the Farm Bill.  She provided additional leadership by serving as the bipartisan co-chair of the Rural Caucus and as the chair of the Congressional Black Caucus Foundation.

Clayton and other members of the House of Representatives objected to counting the 25 electoral votes from Florida which George W. Bush narrowly won after a contentious recount. Because no senator joined her objection, the objection was dismissed by Vice President Al Gore, who was Bush's opponent in the 2000 presidential election. Without Florida's electoral votes, the election would have been decided by the U.S. House of Representatives, with each state having one vote in accordance with the Twelfth Amendment to the United States Constitution.

In 2003, Clayton was appointed Assistant Director-General and Special Adviser to the Director-General on World Food Summit Follow-up with the Food Agriculture Organization (FAO) of the United Nations in Rome, Italy.  She served in that capacity for three years, in which she was responsible for encouraging the establishment of global alliances and partnerships to fight hunger and poverty in twenty-four different countries around the world, including the United States, Brazil, Ghana, and Jordan.  Clayton remains a strong advocate for the hungry and the poor and she continuously promotes sustainable agriculture and equality in this country and around the world.

Clayton is currently an independent consultant for Eva Clayton Associates International (ECAI), where she focuses her efforts on improving global agriculture, food security, poverty reduction, and rural development.  She advocates for the elimination of hunger, encourages corporations and other entities to actively engage in economic development, and promotes strengthening the infrastructure within rural communities.  She is a recognized subject matter expert whose editorials receive attention in national publications.

She is the recipient of eight honorary doctorate degrees and an active member of Alpha Kappa Alpha sorority.  Clayton is an Elder at Cotton Memorial Presbyterian Church in Henderson, North Carolina. She serves on several boards that address hunger, agriculture and state policy issues, including the United States Alliance to End Hunger, the Global Food Banking Network, and the Center for Environmental Farming Systems. 

In November 2022, North Carolina Governor Roy Cooper awarded Clayton the 2022 North Carolina Award, the highest civilian honor given by the state.

Clayton is married to Theaoseus T. Clayton Sr., Esq. and they have four children and six grandchildren.

See also
List of African-American United States representatives
Women in the United States House of Representatives

References

External links
Congressional Biography
Oral History Interview with Eva Clayton at Oral Histories of the American South, University of North Carolina
The History Makers Biography, including interview from Feb. 22, 2012

1934 births
African-American members of the United States House of Representatives
African-American people in North Carolina politics
African-American women in politics
County commissioners in North Carolina
Democratic Party members of the United States House of Representatives from North Carolina
Female members of the United States House of Representatives
Johnson C. Smith University alumni
Living people
North Carolina Central University alumni
Politicians from Savannah, Georgia
Women in North Carolina politics
20th-century American politicians
21st-century American politicians
20th-century American women politicians
21st-century American women politicians
20th-century African-American women
20th-century African-American politicians
21st-century African-American women
21st-century African-American politicians